Aleksandr Viktorovich Tikhonovetsky (born 11 April 1979) is a Russian football coach and a former player. He is an assistant coach with FC Luch-Energiya Vladivostok.

Career
He made his debut in the Russian Premier League in 2001 with PFC CSKA Moscow.

He is a nephew of former FC Okean Nakhodka and FC Lokomotiv Moscow player Oleg Garin (who is considered the most well known Okean player ever) and until 2004 was known as Aleksandr Garin. After his uncle Oleg mentioned in his autobiography that he thinks Aleksandr's last name has helped him in his football career, Tikhonovetsky changed it, taking his wife's last name.

In 2006, he was disqualified for 8 months for testing positive for marijuana.

External links
 
  Profile on the FC Kuban Krasnodar site

1979 births
Living people
People from Nakhodka
Russian footballers
Doping cases in association football
Russian sportspeople in doping cases
FC Okean Nakhodka players
FC Luch Vladivostok players
PFC CSKA Moscow players
FC Chernomorets Novorossiysk players
FC Kuban Krasnodar players
Russian Premier League players
FC Spartak Vladikavkaz players
FC Nizhny Novgorod (2007) players
Association football forwards
Sportspeople from Primorsky Krai